Clanculus richeri is a species of sea snail, a marine gastropod mollusk in the family Trochidae, the top snails.

Description
The height of the shell attains 14 mm.

Distribution
This marine species occurs off New Caledonia and in the Coral Sea.

References

 Vilvens, C., 2000. Description of a new species of Clanculus (Gastropoda: Trochidae) from New Caledonia. Novapex 1(3-4): 95-99

External links

richeri
Gastropods described in 2000